Araripina Futebol Clube is a football team based in Araripina in Pernambuco. Founded in 2008, they play in the Série A1 of the Campeonato Pernambucano.

Stadium
Araripina plays their home matches at the Estádio Gilson Tiburtino de Souza, known as Chapadão do Araripe, which has a capacity of 5,000 seats.

Current squad

External links

Official
Official site

 
Association football clubs established in 2008
Football clubs in Pernambuco
2008 establishments in Brazil